The 2002 Winter Olympic Games Snowboarding competition consisted of men's and women's Halfpipe and Parallel Giant Slalom events. The snowboarding competition took place at Park City, over a five-day period.

Medal summary

Medal table

Men's events

Women's events

Participating NOCs
Nineteen nations competed in the snowboarding events at Salt Lake City.

References

External links
Official Results Book – Snowboarding

 
2002 Winter Olympics events
2002
2002 in snowboarding